"Human" is the fourth single released by Canadian pop rock singer Skye Sweetnam. The song is the lead single released by Sweetnam off of her second album Sound Soldier. The song was produced by production group The Matrix.

Song information
The song was released on her MySpace as a sneak peek, while the full version was leaked to the internet on September 8, 2007. Sweetnam performed the song while she toured across Canada in October and November 2007 as the opening act for Kalan Porter and then on her own tour with Faber Drive. She also performed "Human" as part of her setlist on the 2007 School Rocks Canada tour. The new song was released through EMI, quelling rumors of Sweetnam being dropped from Capitol Records.

Music video
The music video, directed by Sean Wainsteim, was inspired by the film Tank Girl. Sweetnam is in a wasteland where she's surrounded by "junk people" while singing about how "we're only human".  She also leads the group of "junkies" in a dance sequence and is followed while driving a bulldozer.  The ending of the video has a comic book-style animation sequence. This was drawn by comic book artist Cameron Stewart.

References

External links

2007 singles
Skye Sweetnam songs
Song recordings produced by the Matrix (production team)
Songs written by Lauren Christy
Songs written by Graham Edwards (musician)
Songs written by Scott Spock
2007 songs
EMI Records singles